Solariella lusitanica is a species of sea snail, a marine gastropod mollusk in the family Solariellidae.

Description

Distribution
This species occurs in European waters off Portugal.

References

 Fischer P., 1882–1883: Diagnoses d'espèces nouvelles de mollusques recueillis dans le cours des expéditions scientifiques de l'aviso "Le Travailleur" (1880 et 1881) ; Journal de Conchyliologie 30: 49–53 [1882], 273–277
 Gofas, S.; Le Renard, J.; Bouchet, P. (2001). Mollusca, in: Costello, M.J. et al. (Ed.) (2001). European register of marine species: a check-list of the marine species in Europe and a bibliography of guides to their identification. Collection Patrimoines Naturels, 50: pp. 180–213

External links

lusitanica
Gastropods described in 1887